James Crapo Cristy, Jr. (January 22, 1913 – June 7, 1989) was an American competition swimmer who represented the United States at the 1932 Summer Olympics in Los Angeles, California.  Cristy received a bronze medal for his third-place finish in the men's 1500-meter freestyle, recording a time of 19:39.5 in the event final. He also swam in the men's 1500 metre freestyle at the 1936 Summer Olympics.

See also
 List of Olympic medalists in swimming (men)
 List of University of Michigan alumni

References

External links
  Jim Cristy – Olympic athlete profile at Sports-Reference.com

1913 births
1989 deaths
American male freestyle swimmers
Michigan Wolverines men's swimmers
Olympic bronze medalists for the United States in swimming
Sportspeople from Kalamazoo, Michigan
Swimmers at the 1932 Summer Olympics
Swimmers at the 1936 Summer Olympics
Medalists at the 1932 Summer Olympics